Pen-y-wenallt is a hamlet in Ceredigion (formerly Cardiganshire), Wales. Pen-y-wenallt lies halfway between Cenarth and Pont Ceri, bordering on Carmarthenshire, and is a constituent of the Parish of Llandygwydd. The River Teifi (or Afon Teifi) flows along its southern border.

Pen-y-wenallt was the home of the seventeenth century theologian, Theophilus Evans.

References

Populated places in Ceredigion